Frederika is a city in Bremer County, Iowa, United States. The population was 204 at the time of the 2020 census. It is named for Fredrika Bremer (note different spelling), the Swedish author, for whom the surrounding county was also named.

Frederika is part of the Waterloo–Cedar Falls Metropolitan Statistical Area.

Geography
Frederika is located at  (42.882383, -92.306068).

Demographics

2010 census
As of the census of 2010, there were 183 people, 96 households, and 48 families residing in the city. The racial makeup of the city was 98.4% White, 0.5% Native American, and 1.1% Asian.

There were 96 households, of which 12.5% had children under the age of 18 living with them, 42.7% were married couples living together, 6.3% had a female householder with no husband present, 1.0% had a male householder with no wife present, and 50.0% were non-families. 39.6% of all households were made up of individuals, and 15.7% had someone living alone who was 65 years of age or older. The average household size was 1.91 and the average family size was 2.42.

The median age in the city was 49.9 years. 10.9% of residents were under the age of 18; 9.4% were between the ages of 18 and 24; 18.5% were from 25 to 44; 37.2% were from 45 to 64; and 24% were 65 years of age or older. The gender makeup of the city was 53.6% male and 46.4% female.

2000 census
As of the census of 2000, there were 199 people, 96 households, and 60 families residing in the city. The racial makeup of the city was 99.00% White. Hispanic or Latino of any race were 1.00% of the population.

There were 96 households, out of which 19.8% had children under the age of 18 living with them, 58.3% were married couples living together, 2.1% had a female householder with no husband present, and 37.5% were non-families. 36.5% of all households were made up of individuals, and 25.0% had someone living alone who was 65 years of age or older. The average household size was 2.07 and the average family size was 2.70.

In the city, the population was spread out, with 16.1% under the age of 18, 7.0% from 18 to 24, 20.1% from 25 to 44, 27.6% from 45 to 64, and 29.1% who were 65 years of age or older. The median age was 51 years. For every 100 females, there were 99.0 males. For every 100 females age 18 and over, there were 94.2 males.

The median income for a household in the city was $36,250, and the median income for a family was $47,500. Males had a median income of $30,625 versus $25,500 for females. The per capita income for the city was $20,224. About 10.3% of families and 12.6% of the population were below the poverty line, including 25.8% of those under the age of eighteen and 6.1% of those 65 or over.

Education
The Tripoli Community School District operates local public schools.

References

Cities in Bremer County, Iowa
Cities in Iowa
Swedish-American culture in Iowa
Waterloo – Cedar Falls metropolitan area